Borton may refer to:

People
Amyas Borton, British air marshal, brother of Arthur
Arthur Borton, British Army and Navy officer who won the Victoria Cross
Arthur Borton (British Army officer), Governor of Malta
Babe Borton, American baseball player
Hugh Borton, American historian
Neville Borton, Vicar of Burwell, Cambridge
Pam Borton, American women's basketball coach

Places
Borton, Illinois, an unincorporated town in the United States